Isopogon attenuatus is a species of plant in the family Proteaceae and is endemic to the south-west of Western Australia. It is a shrub with oblong to spatula-shaped or linear leaves and spherical heads of yellow flowers.

Description
The flowers are arranged in sessile, more or less spherical heads  in diameter.

Taxonomy
Isopogon attenuatus was first formally described in 1810 by Robert Brown in the Transactions of the Linnean Society of London.

Distribution and habitat
This isopogon grows in woodland with a heathy understorey, in scattered population from near Perth to Albany and  Mount Manypeaks, in the south-west of Western Australia.

Conservation status
Isopogon attenuatus is classified as "not threatened" by the Government of Western Australia Department of Parks and Wildlife.

References

attenuatus
Eudicots of Western Australia
Plants described in 1810
Endemic flora of Western Australia
Taxa named by Robert Brown (botanist, born 1773)